The discography of the Georgian-British singer and songwriter Katie Melua.

Albums

Studio albums

Live albums

Compilation albums

Collaboration albums

Extended plays

Singles

Notes
A  The single "To Kill You with a Kiss" is called "I'd Love to Kill You" on the album The House (2010).

Video albums

Other appearances

References

External links
 Official website
 
 
 

Discographies of British artists
Pop music discographies
Discographies of artists from Georgia (country)